Cry Baby is a 1963 album by Garnet Mimms featuring "Cry Baby" and 11 other hits produced by Jerry Ragovoy.

Track listing

Side 1
 Cry Baby (Bert Berns, Jerry Ragovoy)
 Nobody But You (Dee Clark)
 Until You Were Gone (Joy Byers)
 Anytime You Want Me (Garnet Mimms, Norman Meade)
 So Close (Jerry Ragovoy, Sam Bell)
 For Your Precious Love (Arthur Brooks, Richard Brooks, Jerry Butler)

Side 2
 Baby Don't You Weep (Norman Meade, Bert Russell)
 A Quiet Place (Norman Meade, Sam Bell)
 Cry to Me (Bert Russell)
 Don't Change Your Heart (Sam Bell)
 Wanting You (Buddy Kaye, Philip Springer)
 The Truth Hurts (Jimmy Radcliffe, O. Diamond)

Personnel
 Garnet Mimms - lead vocals
 Zola Pearnell - backing vocals (side 1, track 5; side 2, tracks 2 and 4)
 Sam Bell - backing vocals (side 1, track 5; side 2, tracks 2 and 4)
 Charles Boyer - backing vocals (side 1, track 5; side 2, tracks 2 and 4)
 The Gospelaires (various combinations of Dionne Warwick, Dee Dee Warwick, Estelle Brown, Cissy Houston, and others) - backing vocals (all other tracks)

References

1963 albums